Karisimbi is a commune of the city of Goma in North Kivu, Democratic Republic of the Congo. It is named after the nearby Mount Karisimbi.

It encompasses the following neighbourhoods:

 Ndosho
 Mugunga 
 Virunga
 Murara 
 Majengo 
 Katoyi 
 Kasika
 Mabanga Sud 
 Mabanga Nord 
 Kahembe 
 Bujovu

References 

Goma
Communes of the Democratic Republic of the Congo